Glochidion sumatranum  known as the umbrella cheese tree is a plant in the family Phyllanthaceae. Although recognized as a distinct species by some sources, others include it within Glochidion zeylanicum. It is found in northern and eastern Australia, New Guinea and Indonesia. The habitat is rainforest, or rainforest margins in swampy areas, sometimes associated with palms. It may grow to 15 metres tall. The most southerly point of natural distribution is Iluka, New South Wales.

Glochidion sumatranum presumably is dependent on leafflower moths (Epicephala spp.) for its pollination, like other species of tree in the genus Glochidion.

References 

Flora of New South Wales
Flora of Queensland
Flora of Western Australia
Flora of the Northern Territory
Flora of New Guinea
Flora of Sumatra
sumatranum
Plants described in 1861